Oliva atalina is a species of sea snail, a marine gastropod mollusk in the family Olividae, the olives.

Description

Distribution
This species occurs in the Indian Ocean off Mauritius and in the seas about China and Japan.

References

 Sargent D.M. & Petuch E.J. (2012) A new species of Oliva (Gastropoda: Olividae) from Mauritius, Mascarene Islands. Visaya 3(5): 4–10.
 Vervaet F.L.J. (2018). The living Olividae species as described by Pierre-Louis Duclos. Vita Malacologica. 17: 1-111.

External links
 Duclos, P. L. (1835-1840). Histoire naturelle générale et particulière de tous les genres de coquilles univalves marines a l'état vivant et fossile publiée par monographie. Genre Olive. Paris: Institut de France. 33 plates: pls 1-12

atalina
Gastropods described in 1835